The Marauders are the athletic teams that represent the University of Mary, located in Bismarck, North Dakota, in NCAA Division II intercollegiate sports. The Marauders compete as members of the Northern Sun Intercollegiate Conference for all 16 varsity sports . The University also is home to an ACHA men's hockey team. As of November 11, 2019, the University of Mary has discontinued their men's soccer program after 25 seasons of playing in the Great Northwest Athletic Conference.

University of Mary Marauders Athletics
The University of Mary is a member of NCAA Division II and the Northern Sun Intercollegiate Conference and offers nine varsity sports for women and eight for men.

The "Marauders" as Mascot
The mascot or nickname "Marauders" was chosen by a selection process of the student body in the early 1970s. Dr. Timothy George, prominent theologian and founding Dean of Beeson Divinity School, offered commentary on the choice of this mascot for a Christian, Catholic school in an essay published in First Things in 2014, "Mary on the Prairie." In 2017 the University unveiled in its campus restaurant a life-sized statue of a Marauder as a barbary corsair absorbed in conversation with Saint John of Matha. In 2018 the mascot was dubbed "Maximus," a nod to Maximus the Confessor.

Marauders history
Athletics at the University of Mary began in 1970 when Fritz Fell was brought on board to start a men's basketball program. Al Bortke succeeded Fell in 1973 as the men's basketball coach and athletic director and over the next 36 years would develop an athletic program that enjoyed tremendous success at the NAIA level and later in NCAA Division II. After achieving a record of 335–156 in 16 years as the men's basketball coach that included 11 20-win seasons, Bortke became U-Mary's first full-time athletic director in 1989. During Bortke's tenure, Mary grew from one varsity sport (men's basketball) to as many as 19 and the Marauders athletic program became a national power in the NAIA. A member of both the Marauders and NAIA athletic halls of fame, Bortke spearheaded the University of Mary's move to NCAA Division II.

Varsity sports

Teams

Men's sports
 Baseball
 Basketball
 Cross country
 Football
 Indoor Track & Field
 Outdoor Track & Field
 Wrestling
 Hockey

Women's sports
 Basketball
 Cross  Country
 Indoor Track & Field
 Outdoor Track & Field
 Soccer
 Softball
 Swimming
 Tennis
 Volleyball

References

External links
 

 
1970 establishments in North Dakota
Sports clubs established in 1970
University of Mary